The discography of the Creatures, an English alternative band, consists of four studio albums, three live albums, three compilation albums, two extended plays and eight singles. This list does not include material recorded by band members with Siouxsie and the Banshees or solo work by Siouxsie Sioux. This page lists albums, singles and compilations by the Creatures, alongside their chart positions and release dates in the United Kingdom.

Most of their back catalogue has long been out of print physically. Only the compilation CD A Bestiary Of (which reunites all their early material recorded between 1981 and 1983) is still available in record stores. Their second album Boomerang  is available on iTunes and other media players whereas their third and fourth albums released on Sioux Records are not available on any official digital platform except Spotify.

Albums

Studio albums

Live albums

Compilation albums

Extended plays

Singles

Other appearances

Exclusive releases
From 1998 through 2001, the Creatures rewarded members of their official fan club, Gifthorse, with special releases featuring exclusive content, such as recordings of Christmas songs, original material and live content. Other special releases were made available in limited quantities directly on their website, the last one being Hái! (Náma) in 2004.

Music videos

References

Discographies of British artists
Rock music group discographies